Succinea guamensis is a species of air-breathing land snail, a terrestrial gastropod mollusk in the family Succineidae, the amber snails.

Distribution
This species is endemic to Guam.

References

Fauna of Guam
Succineidae
Taxonomy articles created by Polbot